The Ostdeutscher Sparkassen Cup was a tennis tournament held in Dresden, Germany since 2005. The event was part of the ATP Challenger Series and was played on outdoor clay courts.

Past finals

Singles

Doubles

External links 
ITF Search

ATP Challenger Tour
Sport in Dresden
Tennis tournaments in Germany
Clay court tennis tournaments